The Ouachita pebblesnail, scientific name †Somatogyrus amnicoloides, was a species of minute freshwater snail with an operculum, an aquatic gastropod mollusc or micromollusc in the family Hydrobiidae.

This species was endemic to the United States. Its natural habitat was rivers, and it was named after the Ouachita River. This species is now extinct.

References

Somatogyrus
Extinct gastropods
Gastropods described in 1915
Taxonomy articles created by Polbot